The 2005 Clásica de San Sebastián was the 25th edition of the Clásica de San Sebastián cycling classic. Constantino Zaballa gave Saunier Duval–Prodir their second win in this race.

General Standings

13-08-2005: San Sebastián, 227 km.

References

External links
Race website 

Clasica de San Sebastian
Clásica de San Sebastián
San